GURPS Fantasy is a Genre Toolkit source book which was first designed by Steve Jackson and published by Steve Jackson Games in 1986 for the GURPS role-playing game.  It presented a magic system for the game as well as background information for the fantasy campaign world of Yrth. A second edition by new writers was published in 1990 as GURPS Fantasy: The Magical World of Yrth.  These two editions received mixed reviews in game periodicals including Dragon, Space Gamer/Fantasy Gamer, and Games International. The fourth edition of GURPS separates the fantasy parts into fantasy and a setting book called GURPS Banestorm.

Contents
The first edition of GURPS Fantasy (1986) delivers the GURPS magic system and the background to the campaign world; with over 300 spells and 20 colleges of magic, the magic system is wide, varied, and detailed. Snatched from Earth the Crusaders still wage war on their ancient enemy, the Saracens, simultaneously contending with a wide range of ravaging monsters. Extensive commentary on the countries of Yrth and plenty of staging tips are included.

The first edition is a GURPS supplement of fantasy rules, with a campaign setting. The rules cover magic (spell-point system) and spells (over 300), character creation, nonhuman races, magical creatures, and monsters. The campaign setting describes the world of Yrth (focusing on the country of Caithness), several other lands of humans and dwarves, plus data on culture and customs. It includes a color map. The original was supplanted by GURPS Fantasy 2nd edition and GURPS Magic.

GURPS Fantasy used the fantasy world of Yrth, which was introduced in Orcslayer (1985), the single supplement for Man to Man. The magic rules for GURPS were not included in the original GURPS Basic Set, but were released in GURPS Fantasy (1986), which was also the first setting book published for GURPS and added details to Yrth.

The second edition - GURPS Fantasy: The Magical World of Yrth, 1990, second edition 1995 - is actually a completely new product based on the campaign-setting material in the first edition. The world of Yrth is described in much greater detail; the descriptions of the various kingdoms take 70 pages. The chief religions of Christianity, Islam, and Judaism receive much more attention, and there are a lot of guidelines on how to set up an Yrth campaign, such as what elements to include in a game, and what to emphasize and what to play down. A two-color map is included. The magic rules were expanded and re-issued in their own book, GURPS Magic (first edition 1989, second edition 1994).

The background for Yrth was expanded further in GURPS Fantasy Second Edition: The Magical World of Yrth, and the magic rules were moved to be included in the main GURPS rules set.

GURPS Fantasy for 4e covers creation of many different types of Fantasy settings include High and Low, Dark and Light, Swords and Sorcery, and Myth. Example races are provided for all the standard fantasy Tropes as templates.  The Yrth setting was moved out entirely to a new book called GURPS Banestorm, released in October 2005.

One chapter is spent on describing an example setting called Roma Arcana, based on a fantastical Rome that never completely fell.

Yrth (setting)
Note: Although the early editions of GURPS Fantasy contained information on Yrth, in GURPS 4E this is now in a separate book called GURPS Banestorm (2005)

A basic premise of the setting is that magical banestorms pick up people and whole villages from other worlds (including Earth) and deposit them on Yrth.  As a result, many of the societies and cultures are reminiscent of a Crusades-era Earth, albeit with magic.  One significant difference this brings is that, unlike many fantasy settings, Yrth has many of the major Earth faiths as its core religions, including Christianity, Islam, Hinduism, Buddhism, Judaism and others.

The settings's official timeline syncs up with our own, so that a "normal" campaign would be set in 2005 or 2006.  The Banestorm started about 1,000 years ago when a group of "Dark Elves" completed a magical ritual designed to banish all Orcs from Yrth.  The spell backfired horribly, and instead brought people from other worlds.  Although the majority of Banestorm strikes occurred shortly after the initial backfire, giving the world its fantasy-medieval flavor, occasional flare-ups have occurred since then.  For instance, in the 16th century a number of humans were transported to Yrth from France, bringing with them dangerous knowledge of Protestantism, and gunpowder.  The latter has since been suppressed due to concerns by the Empire of Megalos about too much technological progress.

Themes of Yrth
Yrth was designed such that each region enables a different flavor of campaign.  Araterre, for instance, is a seafaring nation inhabited by the descendants of those brought to Yrth from France in the 16th century.  Light or no armor, swashbuckling, and courtly intrigue are the rule of the day.  Sahud is the Asian mish-mash country, and would be suitable for a wuxia style game, or even something akin to Legend of the Five Rings.  Some countries are almost entirely human-dominated, and others are mixed, while there are still some area completely under the control of Elves, Orcs, Dwarves, or Reptile Men.

Major regions of Yrth

 Al-Haz: Shiite Islamic
 Al-Wazif: Sunni Islamic
 Araterre - Island nation.  16th Century Catholicism brought into line by Banestorm Church. strong Huguenot "heresy".
 Cardiel - Formed from the former Islamic Nation of Al-Kard, which was conquered by Megalos, but lost control of Cardiel. Nominally Catholic, practices tolerance of other religions.
 Caithness:  Catholic
 Megalos — The largest nation of Yrth, Megalos is a human-dominated Christian Empire. Catholic
 The Nomad Lands:  Pagan
 The Oceans
 The Orclands: Anti-The Eternal
 Sahud - Quasi-Asian nation on the northern coast of Yrth. Buddhist/Shinto
 The Great Forest.  Elven worhip of the Eternal
 The Southwestern Wilderness
 Tredroy: City of Three Laws — Tredroy is a city divided between the rule of Cardiel, Al-Haz and Al-Wazif.
 Zarak — The Underground Kingdom of the Dwarves.  Dwarven Worship of the Eternal

Publication history

GURPS Fantasy was written by Steve Jackson, with a cover by Denis Loubet, and was first published by Steve Jackson Games in 1986 as a 100-page book. The second edition, GURPS Fantasy: The Magical World of Yrth was written by Kirk Tate and Janet Naylor, with a cover by Kirk Reinert, and was published by Steve Jackson Games in 1990 as a 144-page book.

GURPS Fantasy II: Adventures in the Mad Lands (1993) was designed by Robin D. Laws with editing by Steve Jackson, and published by Steve Jackson Games as a 128-page softcover book with one 15" × 20" map sheet. It featured illustrations by John Hartwell, a map by Laura Eisenhour, and a cover by Rob Prior. Alarums & Excursions led Robin Laws to write GURPS Fantasy II for Steve Jackson Games in 1992.

GURPS Fantasy for 4e was published in 2004, one of several genre books published by Steve Jackson Games for the new edition.

Reception
Jim Bambra reviewed GURPS Fantasy for Dragon magazine #131 (March 1988). He felt that the book presents the magic system and background to the campaign world "in a highly satisfying way" and that "Best of all, it works!" On the campaign world, he comments: "Rich in background and plundering freely from Earth history and religion, the world of Yrth is easily accessible and nicely presented." Bambra concludes: "Extensive commentary on the countries of Yrth and plenty of staging tips make this a strong contender on the campaign front. GURPS Fantasy is an impressive product that is well worth a look."

J. Michael Caparula reviewed GURPS Fantasy in Space Gamer/Fantasy Gamer No. 81. Caparula commented that "GURPS: Fantasy can be seen as 180 degrees apart from something detailed and imposing like Harn. I think I'll look for something in the middle of that spectrum: easy to use, but still interesting and inventive."

The July 1990 edition of Games International (Issue 16) reviewed the second edition, and commented that it was "a setting that anyone could knock up in a spare weekend." The reviewer concluded that it was designed for "those gamers who are in need of a fantasy world in a hurry."

Rick Swan reviewed GURPS Fantasy II for Dragon magazine #198 (October 1993). Swan comments in his evaluation: "I suspect that Laws wants us to be intrigued by the contrast between the utopian tribesmen and the chaotic deities. But I was never intrigued as much as I was amused, perhaps because it's hard to get worked up over a deity resembling a giant moose. The nuts and bolts of the relationship between the deities and the tribesmen remain unclear; as that's the crux of the book, it's a significant flaw. Despite the tantalizing possibilities, Laws hedges his bets and never cuts loose. I'd liked to have seen something really mad, like a village of Footless, or a gang war between the Gopher God and Mr. Moose. Adventures in the Mad Lands boasts an exquisite premise, but it could use a bolder vision."

Reviews
Dragão Brasil (Issue 6 - Sep 1995) (Portuguese)

Awards
The first edition of GURPS Fantasy was a Gamers' Choice award-winner.
At the 1987 Origins Awards, GURPS Fantasy was a nominee for Best Roleplaying Supplement of 1986.
At the 2006 Origins Awards, GURPS 4e Fantasy was a nominee for Best Roleplaying Game of 2005.

References

2004 books
Fantasy role-playing game supplements
GURPS 1st/2nd edition
GURPS 3rd edition
GURPS 4th edition
Fantasy
Role-playing game supplements introduced in 1986
Yrth